Yön Polte is a Finnish musical trio originating from Finland established in 2012 and made up of Finnish rapper Kuningas Pähkinä, rapper and producer Setä Tamu and singer/rapper Stig (aka Stig Dogg). 

Yön Polte found chart success through their single "Tyttö sinä olet meritähti" that reached #7 in the Finnish Singles Chart in May 2012.

Discography

Singles

References

External links
Yön Polte Facebook page

Finnish musical groups